Cape Jervis Lighthouse is a lighthouse located at the headland of Cape Jervis on the most westerly part of the Fleurieu Peninsula on the east coast of Gulf St Vincent in South Australia.

History
It was first lit on 10 August 1871.  In 1972, the original tower was replaced by a new tower.

See also

 List of lighthouses in Australia

References

External links

 Australian Maritime Safety Authority

Lighthouses completed in 1871
Lighthouses in South Australia
1871 establishments in Australia
Fleurieu Peninsula
j